Cercocarpus douglasii, common name Klamath mountain mahogany, is a plant species native to northern California and southwestern Oregon.

Cercocarpus douglasii is a tree up to 5 meters (17 feet) tall with rough, gray bark. Leaves are oblong to oblanceolate, up to 5 cm (2 inches) long, with rounded tips, green and hairless on the upper side but whitish with woolly hairs underneath. Flowers are borne in groups of 2 or 3 in the axils of the leaves.

References

douglasii
Flora of Oregon
Plants described in 1913
Flora of California
Flora without expected TNC conservation status